The following list of scholarly journals in international relations contains notable academic journals on international relations. It is not comprehensive, as there are hundreds currently published. Popular magazines or other publications related to international relations (of which there are also many) are not listed.

A

 American Journal of International Law
 American Journal of Political Science
 American Political Science Review
 Annual Review of Political Science
 Australian Journal of International Affairs

B

 British Journal of Politics and International Relations
 Bulletin of the Atomic Scientists

C

 Cambridge Review of International Affairs
 Chinese Journal of International Politics, The
 Conflict Management and Peace Science
 Cooperation and Conflict

E

 East European Politics
 European Journal of International Law
 European Journal of International Relations
 European Journal of International Security
 European Union Politics

F

 Fletcher Forum of World Affairs
 Foreign Affairs
 Foreign Policy Analysis

G

 Georgetown Journal of International Affairs
 Global Change, Peace & Security
 Global Governance
 Global Policy

H

 Harvard International Review

I

 International Affairs
 International Feminist Journal of Politics
 International Journal of Conflict and Violence
 International Journal of Transitional Justice
 International Organization
 International Political Sociology
 International Relations
 International Relations of the Asia-Pacific
 International Security
 International Studies
 International Studies Perspectives
 International Studies Quarterly
 International Studies Review
 International Theory

J

 Journal of Common Market Studies
 Journal of Conflict Resolution
 Journal of European Integration
 Journal of European Public Policy
 Journal of Global Security Studies
 Journal of International Affairs
 Journal of Peace Research
 Journal of Politics
 Journal of Strategic Studies

M

 Marine Policy
 Mediterranean Politics
 Millennium: Journal of International Studies

N

 New Political Economy

O

 Orbis

P

 Perspectives on Politics
 Political Science Quarterly

R

 Review of International Organizations
 Review of International Political Economy
 Review of International Studies
 Review of World Economics

S

 SAIS Review
 Security Dialogue
 Security Studies
 Survival

T

 Terrorism and Political Violence

W

 West European Politics
 World Economy, The
 World Politics

Y

 Yale Journal of International Affairs

 
International relations